Doing Optimality Theory: Applying Theory to Data is a 2008 book by  John McCarthy in which the author provides a practical introduction to optimality theory.

Reception
The book was reviewed by Kyoko Yamaguchi, Walcir Cardoso, Sam Hellmuth and Eulàlia Bonet.

References

External links 
 Doing Optimality Theory

2008 non-fiction books
Phonology books
Linguistics textbooks
Optimality Theory
Books on linguistic typology
Wiley-Blackwell books